Dexbudesonide is a synthetic glucocorticoid corticosteroid which was never marketed. It is the 22R-epimer of budesonide.

References

Corticosteroid cyclic ketals
Cyclic acetals with aldehydes
Diketones
Diols
Glucocorticoids
Pregnanes